Kemal Kıvanç Elgaz (born January 1, 1986 in Turkey) is a Turkish former volleyball player.

External links
Player profile at Volleybox.net

1986 births
Living people
Turkish men's volleyball players
Galatasaray S.K. (men's volleyball) players
21st-century Turkish people